Jan Balabán (29 January 1961 – 23 April 2010) was a Czech writer, journalist, and translator. He was considered an existentialist whose works often dealt with the wretched and desperate aspects of the human condition.

Partial biography
Balabán was actually born in Šumperk, North Moravia, Czechoslovakia, but he had already moved with his family to Ostrava by the time he was a year old. He graduated from Palacký University, Olomouc with a degree from the Department of Philosophy. Following graduation, he visited England, Canada and the United States. In 1984 he had a two-month internship at Kings College in Aberdeen in Scotland. His first serious publication was a book of short stories – "The Middle Ages" in 1985. He then worked as a technical translator at the Vítkovice ironworks and later as a freelance translator and journalist, making regular contributions to the magazine Respekt. He also translated the works of H. P. Lovecraft and Terry Eagleton into Czech.

In the 1990s, he, along with Petr Hruška, participated in publishing the magazine Landek.
Speaking of his steel-town home city, he recalled William Faulkner (to whom he was compared), saying: "If you write about a place, you not only love it, but find much to hate." Also a connoisseur of the arts, Balabán's knowledge allowed him to write articles and essays for relevant art journals, exhibitions, catalogs and newspapers. A founding member of the group Prirozeni (The Natural – founded 1980), Balabán helped proliferate the underground arts community and rehabilitate the urban landscape by organizing exhibitions in attics, hallways, in subways and on slag heaps in the suburbs of Ostrava. One of Balabán's most important works, Možná že odcházíme (It May Be That We Go), is a collection of twenty stories in just a hundred pages. The stories deal with characters inspired by people from his home city and the difficult periods in their lives as they suffer disappointments and failures at work and home.

Balabán died on 23 April 2010 at the age of 49. In the week leading up to his death, he was at a month-long authors' festival held in both his home town of Ostrava and Brno. Balabán was divorced with two children. In the last three years he had been working on a new book that dealt with the death of his father.

Published works
 Středověk (Mittelalter), Sfinga, 1995 – Erzählungen Středověk (Middle Ages), Sfinga, 1995 – Stories
 Boží lano (Gottes Seil), Vetus Via, 1998 – Erzählungen Boží lano (God's Rope), Vetus Via, 1998 – Stories
 Prázdniny (Ferien), Host, 1998 – Erzählungen Prázdniny (Holiday), host, 1998 – Narratives
 Černý beran (Der schwarze Widder), Host, 2000 – Roman Černý beran (The Black Ram), host, 2000 – Roman
 Srdce draka (Das Herz des Drachen), Aluze, 2001 – Comic Srdce Draka (The Heart of the Dragon), Aluze, 2001 – Comic
 Kudy šel anděl (Wohin der Engel ging), Vetus Via, 2003, Host, 2005 – Roman Kudy Sel anděl (Where the Angel Went), Vetus Via, 2003, Host, 2005 – Roman
 Možná že odcházíme (Kann sein, dass wir gehen), Host, 2004 – Erzählungen Možná že odcházíme (It May Be That We Go), Host, 2004 – Stories
 Jsme tady (Wir sind hier), Host, 2006 – "Eine Geschichte in zehn Erzählungen" Tady jsme (We Are Here), Host, 2006 – "A story in ten stories"
 Bezruč?!, 2009 – drama (along with Ivan Motyl, first mentioned in 2009 in Ostrava Petr Bezruč Theatre)

Awards
 "It May Be That We Go" – the Magnesia Litera 2005 for prose – as well as a nomination for the "State Prize for Literature".

References

External links

 2005 Český rozhlas article
 Jan Balabán on Facebook
 "A Child on Fire" Translated from the Czech by Ivory Rodriguez
 Czech mini-biography in English

1961 births
2010 deaths
People from Šumperk
Czech novelists
Male novelists
Czech male writers
Czech journalists
Czech translators
Existentialists
20th-century novelists
20th-century translators
20th-century male writers
Palacký University Olomouc alumni
Magnesia Litera winners